Joshua Luke Sheehan (born 30 March 1995) is a Welsh professional footballer who plays as a midfielder for League One club Bolton Wanderers and the Wales national team.

Club career

Swansea City
Sheehan joined Swansea City academy at the age of 10. On 2 November 2012, he signed a professional contract with the club until the summer of 2015. In April 2014, Sheehan signed a new contract at Swansea until the summer of 2016. Sheehan was included in Swansea's 2014–15 pre-season tour of the United States, and later made his professional debut for the club against Rotherham United in the League Cup.

On 17 February 2015, Sheehan signed for Yeovil Town on a month's emergency loan which was later extended until the end of the season. Sheehan made 13 appearances for the Glovers as they were relegated to League Two.

Upon returning to Swansea, Sheehan captained the Under-21 team to the 2014–15 Professional U21 Development League 2 title. Sheehan subsequently signed a new contract with Swansea.

Sheehan rejoined Yeovil on loan in September 2015, returning to Swansea in January 2016.

On 8 August 2016, Sheehan joined Newport County on loan until 21 January 2017. He made his debut for Newport on 24 September 2016 in a League Two match versus Cambridge United as a second-half substitute. He scored his first goal for Newport County on 29 October 2016 in a 3–1 League Two win against Accrington Stanley. On 24 January 2017, the loan was extended to the end of the 2016–17 season but he returned to Swansea on 9 March 2017 after being ruled out for the remainder of the season through injury.

Newport County
On 5 January 2018, Sheehan returned to Newport County on a permanent 18-month deal. He was part of the team that reached the League Two play-off final at Wembley Stadium on 25 May 2019. Newport lost to Tranmere Rovers 1–0 after a goal in the 119th minute. He signed a two-year contract extension with Newport in May 2019. In July 2020 Sheehan was selected as Newport County's Player of the Year for the 2019–20 season. Sheehan played for Newport in the League Two play-off final at Wembley Stadium on 31 May 2021 which Newport lost to Morecambe, 1–0 after a 107th-minute penalty. Sheehan was named in the League Two PFA Team of the year for the 2020–21 season. Sheehan declined a contract extension at Newport at the end of the 2020–21 season.

Bolton Wanderers
At the conclusion of his contract at Newport, Sheehan joined League One club Bolton Wanderers on a two-year deal on 7 June 2021. His competitive debut came on 7 August 2021, when he scored a 20-yard free kick in a 3–3 draw against Milton Keynes Dons. On 20 November 2021, Bolton confirmed that Sheehan had been ruled out for the remainder of the 2021-22 season with a knee ligament injury.

International career
In September 2014, Sheehan was called up to the Wales under-21 squad for matches against Finland under-21 and Lithuania under-21. Sheehan made his Wales under-21 debut in a 2–2 draw against Finland.

On 5 November 2020, Sheehan received his first call-up to the Wales senior squad for matches during November against the US, Finland and Republic of Ireland.

He won his first senior cap on 12 November 2020 as a half time substitute in the 0-0 friendly match against the USA.

Career statistics

Honours
Individual 
PFA Team of the Year: 2020–21 League Two
Newport County Player of the Year: 2019–20

References

External links
 
 
 Newport County profile

1995 births
Living people
Footballers from Llanelli
Welsh footballers
Swansea City A.F.C. players
Newport County A.F.C. players
Yeovil Town F.C. players
Bolton Wanderers F.C. players
Wales youth international footballers
Wales under-21 international footballers
Wales international footballers
English Football League players
Association football midfielders